Fauna of Belarus may refer to:
 List of birds of Belarus
 List of mammals of Belarus

See also
 Outline of Belarus